Strilkovychi is a village (selo) in Sambir Raion, Lviv Oblast, in south-west Ukraine. It belongs to Sambir urban hromada, one of the hromadas of Ukraine. 

The village was established in 1395. A Catholic parish was established before 1483. In the interwar period the village belonged to Poland and was inhabited by around 1,500 people, mostly Poles.

References 

Villages in Sambir Raion